Houchang Esfandiar Chehabi is a scholar of Iranian studies at the Frederick S. Pardee School of Global Studies at Boston University where he is Professor of International Relations and History.

Chehabi is Iranian-German and was born in Tehran, Iran. He is a former Harvard faculty member, as well as UCLA. He received his MA and DPhil from Yale University.

His publications focus on Iran and its history and politics. His books include Iranian Politics and Religious Modernism: The Liberation Movement of Iran under the Shah and Khomeini (1990) and Distant Relations: Iran and Lebanon in the Last 500 Years (2006). In 2015 he was a Fellow at the  Alexander Von Humboldt Foundation in Berlin.

References

External links
 Houchang E. Chehabi, Pardee School of Global Studies, Boston University
 Interview - Houchang E. Chehabi

Boston University faculty
Pardee School of Global Studies faculty
Yale University alumni
Iranian emigrants to the United States
Living people
21st-century American historians
21st-century American male writers
Harvard University faculty
Iranian expatriate academics
Year of birth missing (living people)
American male non-fiction writers